Baqaa, with literal meaning of subsistence or permanency,  is a term in Sufi philosophy which describes a particular state of life with God, through God, in God, and for God. It is the summit of the mystical manazil, that is, the destination or the abode. Baqaa comprises  three degrees, each one referring to a particular aspect of the divine theophanies as principle of existence and its qualitative evolution, consisting of faith, knowledge, and grace. It is the stage where the seeker finally gets ready for the constant vision of God. Hence, it can be termed as Divine Eternity.

See also
Fanaa
Moksha
Nirvana
Sufism

References

Sufi philosophy